Putative trace amine-associated receptor 3 (TAAR3) is a human pseudogene with the gene symbol TAAR3P. In other species such as mice, TAAR3 is a functional protein-coding gene that encodes a trace amine-associated receptor protein.

Isobutylamine is a known ligand of TAAR3 in mice associated with sexual behaviour in male mice.

Isopentylamine was identified as a ligand for murine TAAR3 eliciting aversive behavior.

See also 
 Trace amine-associated receptor

References 

G protein-coupled receptors